The Yunnan japalure (Diploderma yunnanense) is an agamid lizard found in Yunnan in southern China and Kachin in northern Myanmar, and possibly in Thailand. The subspecies Diploderma yunnanense popei is considered synonymous with Diploderma swinhonis.

References

Diploderma
Reptiles of China
Reptiles of Myanmar
Taxa named by John Anderson (zoologist)
Reptiles described in 1878